The Chinese Ambassador to Chile is the official representative of the People's Republic of China to Chile.

List of representatives

See also
China–Chile relations

References 

Ambassadors of China to Chile
Chile
China